Saint-Gérard-Majella is a parish municipality located in the Pierre-De Saurel Regional County Municipality of Québec (Canada), in the administrative region of Montérégie. The population as of the Canada 2011 Census was 246.

Demographics 

Population trend:

Mother tongue language (2006)

See also
List of parish municipalities in Quebec

References

Parish municipalities in Quebec
Incorporated places in Pierre-De Saurel Regional County Municipality